Valdevimbre is a municipality located in the province of León, Castile and León, Spain. According to the 2004 census (INE), the municipality has a population of 1,110 inhabitants.

It is an international and famous village because of its great wines, Prieto Picudo, in the Spanish Denominación de Origen "Tierra de León"

Since 2007 the mayor is Zacarias Martínez González, member of the People's Party.

References

External links

Municipalities in the Province of León